Johann Nepomuk Schaller (30 March 1777, Vienna – 16 February 1842, Vienna) was an Austrian sculptor. His most famous work is a bust of Ludwig van Beethoven at age 55, created at the request of the composer's secretary Karl Holz in 1825. It was later presented to the Royal Philharmonic Society, London, on the occasion of the Beethoven Centennial.

Life 
He was the younger brother of the painter Anton Ferdinand Schaller. From 1789, he attended the Academy of Fine Arts, Vienna where he studied under Hubert Maurer. In 1791, he became an apprentice at the Vienna Porcelain Manufactory. The following year, he began to study sculpture with Franz Anton von Zauner. By 1811, he had become the head of modelling at the factory. Despite his turn to sculpture, he retained his love for porcelain and acted as an artistic advisor to the factory for the rest of his life.

From 1812 to 1823 he lived in Rome on a grant from Prince Metternich, obtained for him by a patron, Count Carl Ludwig Cobenzl. While there, he became familiar with the Nazarene movement, as well as making professional contact with Antonio Canova and Bertel Thorvaldsen. He politely refused an offer from King Ludwig I to come work for him in Munich.

In 1823, he returned to Vienna, having accepted a position as Professor of Sculpture at the Academy. His most famous student there was Joseph Gasser von Valhorn. He died after a brief illness that was not believed to be serious. A street in the Viennese district of Meidling was named after him in 1907.

Selected major works 
 Der jugendliche Amor (The Young Cupid) (Vienna, Österreichische Galerie Belvedere, Inv. Nr. 4202), 1815/16
 Bellerophon im Kampf mit der Chimaira (Bellerophon Fighting the Chimera) (Vienna, Österreichische Galerie Belvedere), 1821 
 Statue of Andreas Hofer, (Hofkirche, Innsbruck, 1827–33
 Margaretenbrunnen (Margaret the Virgin, fountain), Vienna, 1836

References

Further reading 
 Selma Krasa-Florian: Johann Nepomuk Schaller 1777–1842. Ein Wiener Bildhauer aus dem Freundeskreis der Nazarener. Vienna: Schroll, 1977, 
 Schaller, Johann Nepomuk, in Constant von Wurzbach, Biographisches Lexikon des Kaiserthums Oesterreich, Vol.29, Vienna 1875. (Fraktur)

External links 

 The Red List: More works by Schaller
 Royal Academy of Music: Beethoven's bust
 

1777 births
1842 deaths
Austrian sculptors
Austrian male sculptors
Artists from Vienna
Academy of Fine Arts Vienna alumni
Academic staff of the Academy of Fine Arts Vienna